David Phillip Woodruff  FRS is a British physicist, professor at University of Warwick, and member of the Surface, Interface & Thin Films group.

Woorduff is a fellow of the Institute of Physics, and the Woodruff Thesis prize is named in his honour. He won the Nevill Mott Medal and Prize in 2003, and Max Born Medal and Prize in 2011.

Education
He earned a B.Sc. from University of Bristol in 1965, and a Ph.D.(1968), and D.Sc. (1983) from Warwick University.
He formally retired in 2011  but remains research active as an emeritus professor.

Works

References

British physicists
Academics of the University of Warwick
Alumni of the University of Bristol
Living people
Alumni of the University of Warwick
Fellows of the Royal Society
Year of birth missing (living people)